There are around 191 villages in Akole tehsil of Ahmednagar district of state of Maharashtra. Following is the list of village in Akole tehsil.

A
 Abit Khind
 Akole
 Ambad
 Ambevangan
 Ambit
 Aurangpur
 Ambhol

B

 Babhulwandi
 Badgi
 Bahir Wadi
 Bari
 Belapur
 Bhandardara
 Bholewadi
 Bori
 Bramhanwada
 Bhangewadi
 Balthan
 Bitaka

C
 Chandgir Wadi
 
 
 Chas
 Chichondi
 Chinchawane
 Chitalwedhe
 Chitanyapur

D
 Deogaon
 Dhumalwadi
 Devthan
 Dhamangaon Awari
 Dhamangaon Pat
 Dhamanwan
 Dhokari
 Digambar
 Donargaon

E
 Ekdare

G
Ganore
 Gambhirwadi
 Gardani
 Ghatghar
 Ghodsar Wadi
 Ghotkarwadi
 Ghoti
 Gondushi
 Guhire
 Garwadi

H
 Hivargaon Ambre

I
 Indori

J
 Jachakwadi
 Jachakwadi (Dattawadi)
 Jahagirdar Wadi
 Jambhale
 Jamgaon
 Jayana Wadi
 Jadhavwadi

K
 Kalamb
 Kalas Bk
 Kalas Kh
 Karandi
 Katalpur
 Kauthwadi
 Keli Kotul
 Keli Otur
 Kelirumham Wadi
 Kelungan
 Khadaki Kd
 khadaki Bk
 Khanapur
 Khirvire
 Khuntewadi
 Kohane
 Kohondi
 Kokan Wadi
 Koltembhe
 Kombhalane
 Kondani
 Kothale
 Kotul
 shree shetra Kumbhephal 
 Kumshet
 Kalewadi
 Karwadi
 Kokanvadi

L
 Ladgaon
 Lahit Bk
 Lahit Kh
 Lavhali Otur
 Lingdeo
 Lavhali kotul

M
 Malegaon
 Manhere
 Manoharpur
 Manyale
 Maveshi

 Mehenduri
 Mhaladevi
 Mhalungi
 Mogras
 Murshet
 Muthalane
 Mutkhel

N
 Nachanthav
 Nawalewadi
 Nilvande
 Nimbral

P
 Pawarwadi
 Pachapatta Wadi
 Pachnai
 Padalane

 Padoshi
 Paithan
 Palsunde
 Pangari
 Panjare
 Parkhatpur
 Pedhe Wadi
 Pendshet
 Pimpaldara Wadi
 Pimpaldari
 Pimpalgaon Khanjd
 Pimpalgaon Nakwinda
 Pimpalgaon Nipani
 Pimparkane 
 Pipalgaon Khand
 Purushwardi
 Phophasandi

R
 Rajur
 Ratanwadi
 Rede
 Rumbhodi
 Randha Bk

S
 Sakirwadi
 Samrad
 Samsherpur
 Sanghavi
 Satewadi 
 Sawargaon Pat
 Sawarkute
 Shelad
 Shelvihire
 Shendi    
 Shenit
 Sherankhel
 Shilwandi
 Shinganwadi
 Shirpunje Bk
 Shiswad
 Somalwadi
 Sugaon Bk
 Sugaon Kh

Tirde
 Tahakri
 Takli
 Tale 
 Tambhol
 Terungan
 Tirde
 Tirdhe
 Titvi

U
 Udadawane
 Unch Khadak
 Unchkadak Kh

V
 Virgaon
 Vithe
 Vihir

W
 Waghapur
 Waki
 Wanjulshet
 Waranghushi
 Washere
 Waghdari

See also
 Akole tehsil
 Tehsils in Ahmednagar
 Villages in Jamkhed tehsil
 Villages in Karjat tehsil
 Villages in Kopargaon tehsil
 Villages in Nagar tehsil
 Villages in Nevasa tehsil
 Villages in Parner tehsil
 Villages in Pathardi tehsil
 Villages in Rahata tehsil
 Villages in Rahuri tehsil
 Villages in Sangamner tehsil
 Villages in Shevgaon tehsil
 Villages in Shrigonda tehsil
 Villages in Shrirampur tehsil

References

 
Akole